Frank de Vos (born 8 August 1956 in Delft) is a sailor from the Netherlands, who represented his country at the 1976 Summer Olympics in Kingston, Ontario, Canada as substitute for the Dutch Flying Dutchman team of Erik Vollebregt and Sjoerd Vollebregt. In 1980 De Vos returned to the 1980 Summer Olympics, which was boycotted by several countries, as substitute for the Dutch Flying Dutchman.

Sailing career
De Vos started sailing in the Solo. In this class De Vos took the Dutch Championship 1975.

Professional life
De Vos studied Law at the Leiden University and is nowadays partner at Clifford Chance LLP, Amsterdam.

Sources

 
 
 
 
 
 
 
 
 
 

Living people
1956 births
Sportspeople from Delft
Dutch male sailors (sport)
Solo class sailors
Flying Dutchman class sailors
Olympic sailors of the Netherlands